Birendra Lake (Birendra Tal), is a freshwater lake located in Manaslu Glacier in Gorkha District in northern-central Nepal. Birendra Taal is near by Punhyen Glacier and Gompa in Samagaun.

References

Lakes of Gandaki Province